The 2020 Big Ten Conference men's soccer season is the 30th season of men's varsity soccer in the conference. The season was originally scheduled to begin on August 28 and conclude on November 8, 2020. Due to the COVID-19 pandemic, the season was postponed to start February 3, 2021 and conclude on April 17, 2021.

The season will culminate with the 2020 Big Ten Conference Men's Soccer Tournament to determine the conference's automatic berth into the 2020 NCAA Division I Men's Soccer Tournament. 

Indiana enters the season as the two-time defending regular season and tournament champions.

Background

Previous season 

The previous season was the 29th season of men's varsity soccer in the conference. The 2019 Big Ten regular season began on August 30, 2019 concluded on November 3, 2019. The season culminated with the 2019 Big Ten Conference Men's Soccer Tournament to determine the conference's automatic berth into the 2019 NCAA Division I Men's Soccer Tournament.  Indiana went on to win both the regular season and the tournament, winning seven of their eight of their Big Ten Conference games. They defeated Penn State in the Big Ten Men's Soccer Championship Game.

With the Big Ten title, Indiana earned the conference's automatic berth into the 2019 NCAA Tournament, where Maryland, Michigan, and Penn State joined as at-large berths. Maryland and Penn State were eliminated in the Second Round, while Michigan and Indiana were eliminated in the Third Round.

In the 2020 MLS SuperDraft, Jack Maher was selected second-overall in the draft, being selected by expansion team, Nashville SC. Nine total Big Ten players were selected in the draft; tied for the second most of all conferences.

Impact of the COVID-19 pandemic 

Like most Big Ten sports, men's soccer played a conference-only schedule for the 2020–21 academic year. Additionally, like many fall sports, the season was postponed to the spring.

Head coaches

Preseason

Preseason poll 
The preseason poll was released on February 18, 2021. Indiana was selected unanimously as the favorite to win the Big Ten.

Preseason national polls 
The preseason national polls were released in January and February 2021 due to the COVID-19 pandemic.

Regular season

Conference results 
Each team plays every four other conference team twice; once home and once away, and then four other conference teams once.

Positions by round

Postseason

Big Ten Tournament 

The Big Ten Tournament was played from April 10–17.

NCAA Tournament 

The NCAA Tournament will begin in April 2021 and conclude on May 17, 2021.

References

External links 
 Big Ten Men's Soccer

 
2020 NCAA Division I men's soccer season
2020
Association football events postponed due to the COVID-19 pandemic